Prince Frederick Henry of Nassau-Siegen (11 November 1651 – 4 September 1676), official titles: Prinz von Nassau, Graf zu Katzenelnbogen, Vianden, Diez, Limburg und Bronkhorst, Herr zu Beilstein, Stirum, Wisch, Borculo, Lichtenvoorde und Wildenborch, Erbbannerherr des Herzogtums Geldern und der Grafschaft Zutphen), was a count from the House of Nassau-Siegen, a cadet branch of the Ottonian Line of the House of Nassau. He served as an officer in the Dutch States Army. In 1664, he was elevated to the rank and title of prince.

Biography

After the death of their father, Frederick Henry and his brother William Maurice were adopted by their uncle Fürst John Maurice of Nassau-Siegen.

Frederick Henry and his brother William Maurice accompanied their uncle and adoptive father John Maurice on his journey to the city of Siegen, where they arrived on 21/31 August 1663. On 7 January 1664, the two brothers were inaugurated in the town hall of Siegen, where they confirmed the city privileges and liberties. Both brothers were elevated into the Reichsfürstenstand on 6 May 1664.

In 1667 Frederick Henry became a knight of the Order of Saint John (Bailiwick of Brandenburg) in Sonnenburg. On 18 December 1670 he was appointed ritmeester in the Dutch States Army, on 22 June 1674 he became colonel of the infantry.

Ancestors

Notes

References

Sources
 
 
  (1911). "Frederik Hendrik, Friedrich Heinrich". In:  en  (redactie), Nieuw Nederlandsch Biografisch Woordenboek (in Dutch). Vol. Eerste deel. Leiden: A.W. Sijthoff. p. 902.
 
 
 
 
 
 
 
 
 
  (2004). "Die Fürstengruft zu Siegen und die darin von 1669 bis 1781 erfolgten Beisetzungen". In:  u.a. (Redaktion), Siegener Beiträge. Jahrbuch für regionale Geschichte (in German). Vol. 9. Siegen: Geschichtswerkstatt Siegen – Arbeitskreis für Regionalgeschichte e.V. p. 183–202.
 
  (1882). Het vorstenhuis Oranje-Nassau. Van de vroegste tijden tot heden (in Dutch). Leiden: A.W. Sijthoff/Utrecht: J.L. Beijers.

External links 
 Nassau. In: Medieval Lands. A prosopography of medieval European noble and royal families, compiled by Charles Cawley.
 Nassau Part 5. In: An Online Gotha, by Paul Theroff.

1651 births
1676 deaths
German Calvinist and Reformed Christians
German military officers
Frederick Henry
Order of Saint John (Bailiwick of Brandenburg)
17th-century German people